Port Arthur Stadium is a stadium in Thunder Bay, Ontario, Canada.  It is exclusively used for baseball and is the home of the Thunder Bay Border Cats of the Northwoods League. The ballpark has a capacity of 3,031 people and seats 2,581, and was opened in 1951.

References

Sports venues in Thunder Bay
Minor league baseball venues
Baseball venues in Ontario